Shedron D. Williams (born July 29, 1967) is an American politician. He is a former member of the South Carolina House of Representatives from the 122nd District, serving since 2018. He is a member of the Democratic party.  Williams was defeated in the 2022 general election by Bill Hager.

References

Living people
1967 births
Democratic Party members of the South Carolina House of Representatives
21st-century American politicians
African-American people in South Carolina politics
Morehouse College alumni
21st-century African-American politicians
20th-century African-American people